Bhateali, or Bhattiyali, is a Western Pahari language of northern India. It Is spoken Majorily in the Bhattiyat Division of Chamba,Dalhousie As well As Nurpur Division of Kangra and Hilly Parts of Pathankot Also. The 2011 Indian Census counted 23,970 speakers, of which 15,107 were found in Chamba district of Himachal Pradesh. 

Bhateali has sometimes been counted as dialect of either Dogri or  Punjabi. It is listed under Punjabi in the 2011 Census - India.

It was historically written using the Takri script.

Pronouns and Pronoun Cases 

I : म्या/मै

You : त्या/तै

We : अंहां/असा

You(plural) : तुंहां/तुसा

3rd Person  : से

My : मिरा/मिरी/मिरे

Your : तिरा/तिरी/तिरे

Our : स्याढ़ा/स्याढ़ी/स्याढ़ै or हांदा/हांदी/हांदे

Your(plural) : दुआढ़ा/दुआढ़ी/दुआढ़ै 

Own/self : अप्पु

He : तिनी/उनी

She : तिसा/उसा

His : तिद्दा/तिस्दा/उद्दा

Her : तिसादा/उसादा

Their : तिन्दा/तिनादा

That(Masc) : तिस/तैस

That(femi) : तिसा/तैसा

To Me : मिकी/मिकेआ

To you : तिकी/तिकेआ

To Him : तिसेया/तिसी

To Her : तिसाया/तिसाई

To them : तिनेयां/तिनाई

To us : असेयां/साह्की

To All : सभनीयां/सभनी

Me also : मिम्हीं

You also : तुम्हीं

From Me/You : मेर्श/तेर्श

References

Languages of India
Northern Indo-Aryan languages
Languages of Himachal Pradesh